The Burundi Rugby Federation is the governing body for rugby union in Burundi. It is a member of Rugby Africa and became a full member of World Rugby in 2021.

References

Rugby union governing bodies in Africa
Rugby union in Burundi